Dekel Valtzer (born 3 October 1984) is an Israeli former professional tennis player.

Valtzer was the 2005 winner of the Israeli Championships, defeating Amir Weintraub in the final.

In 2006 he was called into the Israel Davis Cup team for a tie against Great Britain in Eastbourne and played a dead rubber reverse singles, which he lost to Alan Mackin. It was his first time playing on grass.

On the professional tour, Valtzer had a best singles ranking of 388 in the world and won two ITF Futures titles. As a doubles players he won a further six Futures tournaments, with a highest ranking of 331.

ITF Futures titles

Singles: (2)

Doubles: (6)

See also
List of Israel Davis Cup team representatives

References

External links
 
 
 

1984 births
Living people
Israeli male tennis players